Superplastic forming and diffusion bonding (SPF/DB) is a technique allowing the manufacture of complex-shaped hollow metallic parts.  It combines Superplastic forming (SPF) with a second element "Diffusion Bonding" to create the completed structures.

Principle
Two metal sheets are welded together at their edges, then heated within the confines of a female mould tool.

When the part is hot, an inert gas is injected between the two sheets ; the part becomes hollow to the form of the mould. Parts may be welded in other areas than the edges to give an internal structure as the sheets are blown.

Applications
 Hollow titanium blades for jet engines.
 Military aircraft structures such the aft fuselage of the McDonnell Douglas F-15E Strike Eagle. McDonnell Douglas (McDonnell Aircraft Company) developed the production equipment and tooling technology in St. Louis during the mid-1980s through the leadership of engineers Ray Kittelson, Vern Mueller, David Rohe and Duane Jennings.

See also
 Superplasticity

References

Joining
Metal forming